The SP-88 is a highway in the southeastern part of the state of São Paulo in Brazil.

Highway names
Pedro Eroles, Rodovia Presidente Dutra - Mogi das Cruzes (km 32 - km 51)
Alfredo Rolim de Moura, Professor, Mogi das Cruzes - SP-99 (km 57 - km 135)

References

Highways in São Paulo (state)